The HomeSync is an Android TV box and home server combo developed by Samsung Mobile. The unit is a full Android Jelly Bean device with a hard drive. While all other connected television units made by Samsung ran Orsay-based Samsung Smart TVs, due to the fact the HomeSync is made by Samsung's mobile division, it ran a skin of Android Jelly Bean. The HomeSync at launch was compatible with the Samsung Galaxy S4 Samsung Galaxy Note 3, Samsung Galaxy S III, Samsung Galaxy Note II, Samsung Galaxy Note 8.0, Samsung Galaxy Note 10.1 2014 Edition and Samsung Galaxy Camera. Others may have been supported if they had a protocol called "Samsung Link". The specs are noted to resemble the Ouya video game console minus the hard drive. It was announced in February 2013 at Mobile World Congress. It has been compared to the Apple TV series by Apple, which also integrated with iOS devices, but did not have network storage and cost less. The console features a 50 USD credit for Media Hub when you buy a HomeSync. On December 17, Samsung made most Android devices support the unit by adding it to the Play Store, also widening support of Samsung phones. Shortly before it launched, the store page and manual were available but unable to be bought.

Remote
When syncing a phone to the HomeSync via the HomeSync app, there are 5 ways to control the unit: 4 navigation Buttons, Trackpad similar to the Apple TV's future Siri Remote, a QWERTY keyboard, and screen-mirroring to the phone, with control like the HomeSync is the phone's UI.

Design
The unit is packaged in a glossy black box. The unit is about the size of three DVD cases stacked on top of one another. When placed on a flat kitchen countertop, it stands at a slight angle upward and the Samsung logo appears on the left side.

Software
You can mirror a compatible mobile display to the unit and also access cloud storage files on the unit. Apps preloaded onto the unit include Google Play, Google Play Music, a photo gallery application, YouTube, a web browser application, and Samsung-branded applications such as Media Hub and Music Hub. The unit runs an unknown version of Android Jelly Bean. The skin supports eight separate accounts and allows all users to upload and download data from multiple devices and share the data with others. There are options for file encryption and user-specific username and password for privacy. Some apps including Google Analytics cannot be installed via the play store and require sideloading.

References

External links
Samsung HomeSync Provides Personal Cloud and Connected Entertainment Experience
Now Enjoy HomeSync with More Android Devices
Samsung HomeSync creates connected media experience for the whole family
Geekbench 3 CPU benchmarks of the Samsung HomeSync

Android (operating system) devices
Samsung
Samsung Electronics products